Zachariah Button (dates unknown) was an English amateur cricketer who made 2 known appearances in first-class cricket matches from 1793 to 1796.

He was mainly associated with Marylebone Cricket Club (MCC) of which he was an early member, having previously joined the White Conduit Club.

References

English cricketers
English cricketers of 1787 to 1825
Year of birth unknown
Year of death unknown
Surrey cricketers
People educated at Westminster School, London
Old Westminsters cricketers